Diana King (born 8 November 1970) is a Jamaican-American singer-songwriter who performs a mixture and fusion of reggae, reggae fusion and dancehall. They were born to an Indo-Jamaican mother and an Afro-Jamaican father.  They are best known for their hit 1995 single "Shy Guy" and their remake of "I Say a Little Prayer" which was featured on the soundtrack to My Best Friend's Wedding.

As of 1998, King has sold over five million records worldwide. Regarded as one of the most successful Jamaican artists, they have scored multiple Billboard Hot 100 and Billboard 200 entries. King is also a recipient of the "Vanguard Award" at the Out Music Awards.

Career
Born in Spanish Town, King was a member of the City Heat band, performing on the local hotel circuit before releasing their first solo single, "Change of Heart", in 1991.

After making an appearance on The Notorious B.I.G.'s 1994 song "Respect", from his album Ready to Die, they signed a recording contract with Sony Music. Their first release was a remake of the Bob Marley song "Stir It Up" (which peaked at no. 53 on the Billboard Hot R&B/Hip Hop Songs chart) for the Cool Runnings soundtrack that same year.

King's next single, "Shy Guy", co-written and produced by Andy Marvel was released in 1995. The song, which only took them 10 minutes to write, became a hit, reaching No. 13 on the Billboard Hot 100 and being certified gold by the RIAA in the U.S.; the single also hit No. 2 on the UK Singles Chart, as well as reaching No. 1 on the Eurochart Hot 100 Singles chart, going on to sell nearly five million singles worldwide. "Shy Guy" was also ranked by the Japanese radio station J-Wave as the No. 1 song of 1995. In the UK, it had a place in the top 10 for seven weeks. It served as a single from the soundtrack to the 1995 film, Bad Boys in addition to being the lead release off their debut album Tougher Than Love which was released on 25 April 1995. The album peaked at No. 1 on Billboard's Reggae, No. 85 on R&B, and No. 179 on the Billboard 200 charts. Two follow-up singles "Love Triangle" (No. 85 R&B) and "Ain't Nobody" (No. 94 Pop, No. 63 R&B) followed that same year. In 1996, King collaborated with Nahki on the single "I'll Do It". Also in 1996, their version of "Piece of My Heart" was included on the soundtrack to the film The First Wives Club.

In 1997, King also scored another hit on the Billboard Hot 100 (No. 38) and the Hot Dance Club Play (No. 8) with their cover version of the song "I Say a Little Prayer" (originally recorded by Dionne Warwick in 1967), which was featured on the soundtrack to the film, My Best Friend's Wedding. Their second album Think Like a Girl was released on 30 September 1997, and entered the Billboard Top Reggae Albums chart at No. 1. The album spawned two more US singles with "L-L-Lies" and "Find My Way Back" in addition to "Supa-Lova-Bwoy" which was released exclusively in Japan. King was also featured on the 1997 soundtrack to the documentary When We Were Kings, where they performed the title track with Brian McKnight.

In 1998, King joined Celine Dion and Brownstone on stage to perform the hit "Treat Her Like a Lady" previously written and recorded by King from Tougher Than Love at the Essence Awards. That year, they also appeared on Soul Train, The RuPaul Show, and VIBE to promote Think Like a Girl.  They also collaborated with artists such as Toots Hibbert, Ziggy Marley, Buju Banton, Ini Kamoze, Maxi Priest, Shaggy, Tony Rebel, I-Three, Brian Gold, Handel Tucker, Lowell 'Sly' Dunbar & Mikey Bennett on the charity single "Rise Up" with Jamaica United.

In 1999, they toured India doing a five city tour. From Goa, they said: "I never thought I would come back to India."

King entered negotiations with Madonna's Maverick Records label in 2000.

In 2002, King premiered their single, "Summer Breezin'" on BET and VH1 video outlets, and it received some urban radio airplay, their third album Respect was released on 24 July 2002 in Japan, with plans for other markets such as the US and Europe eventually cancelled. However, it finally received a release in other markets such as the UK on 17 April 2006 and the United States on 28 April 2008.

In 2006, they released the single "Spanish Town Blues" for a Taxi Records compilation album with Sly & Robbie.

In 2007, King co-wrote and recorded the song "The Light Within" with the German reggae artist Gentleman, for his album Another Intensity. Additionally, they also collaborated with Sarah and Kid Capri for a single called "Get Me @ This Party". Later that year, they formed their own record label, ThinkLikeAgirl.

In 2009, they collaborated with Richie Stephens on a remake of the ballad "The Closer I Get To You" for his album Forever.

In 2010, King's record label ThinkLikeAgirL Music Inc. went through a licensing deal with Warner Music Japan with the release of their fourth album, Warrior Gurl. The album was released in Japan on 22 September 2010. It was led by the single "Yu Dun Kno" which was released that same year. They also recorded a track "Bounce" for another Taxi Records compilation album.

For the international release of the album, King renamed the album to AgirLnaMeKING and it was released on their birthday, 8 November 2012. Two more singles "Closer" and "Jeanz N T-Shirt" were released in 2012.

In 2016, they announced they’re at work on an all-lesbian record label in addition to a new studio album and an EP. The full-length album will be a reggae release, while their EP will be an EDM (electronic dance music) release.

Personal life
King was previously married to their tour manager Orville Aris, with whom they share a son named Dior, born in 1996.

In June 2012, King came out as a lesbian via Facebook, stating: "I answer now, not because it's anyone's business but because it feels right with my soul and I believe by not answering or hiding it all these years somehow makes it appear as if I am ashamed of it or that I believe it is wrong." They have 15 siblings, but due to King coming out, they are now only close to one. King came out to themself in their 20s, but it took a decade for King to be comfortable with it publicly, for any backlash towards their daughter and son.  King was honoured for their bravery on 16, December 2012 and was presented with the prestigious "Vanguard Award" at the Out Music Awards in Las Vegas. King is the first Jamaican artist to ever publicly come out.

In January 2018, King announced that they had married their long-time girlfriend, Jamaican violinist Mijanne Webster.
On September 12, 2018 they announced via Twitter that they identified as non-binary.
In 2020, King stated that they used "he/him", "she/her", and "they/them" pronouns, but in 2022, King changed their pronouns to exclusively use "they/them".

In August 2021, they announced via Twitter the death of their daughter, Shalamar Diana Wright (1987-2021), who was born when Diana was sixteen. Mijanne also tweeted to commemorate Shalamar and thank her for accepting Mijanne as part of her family.

They hold both Jamaican and US citizenships.

Awards and nominations
{| class=wikitable
|-
! Year !! Awards !! Work !! Category !! Result !! Ref.
|-
| rowspan=2|1995
| rowspan=2|Billboard Music Video Awards
| rowspan=2|"Shy Guy"
| Best R&B/Urban Video of the Year
| 
| rowspan=2|
|-
| Best R&B/Urban Video of the Year - New Artist
| 
|-
| 1997
| Online Film & Television Association
| "I Say a Little Prayer"
| Best Adapted Song 
| 
|
|-
| 2012
| Out Music Awards
| Themself
| Vanguard Award
| 
|

Discography

Albums

Live/compilation albums

Singles

References

External links
Official website

1970 births
Dance musicians
Dancehall musicians
20th-century Jamaican women singers
Jamaican reggae singers
People from Saint Catherine Parish
Reggae fusion artists
Living people
Jamaican LGBT singers
Jamaican LGBT songwriters
American LGBT singers
American LGBT songwriters
American lesbian musicians
Lesbian singers
Lesbian songwriters
21st-century Jamaican women singers
Jamaican people of Indian descent
20th-century LGBT people
21st-century LGBT people
Non-binary musicians